Hendrik Van Eck Airport  is an airport serving Phalaborwa, a town in the Limpopo province of South Africa. It's also known as Phalaborwa Airport and is located near Kruger National Park.

Facilities

Airlines and destinations

References

External links
 

Airports in South Africa
Transport in Limpopo
Buildings and structures in Limpopo